The United States Postal Savings System was a postal savings system signed into law by President William Howard Taft and operated by the United States Post Office Department, predecessor of the United States Postal Service, from January 1, 1911, until July 1, 1967.

Operations
The Postal Savings System was established as a result of lobbying by farmers and workers with grievances against the private banking system due to numerous bank closures and inadequate credit opportunities. The system accepted deposits from the general public, but did not offer full banking services. Instead, it redeposited the funds to designated banks at interest. It took one-half percent of the interest to cover administrative expenses and passed on the rest—around two percent—to the customer. Accounts in the system were initially limited to a balance of $500, which was raised to $1,000 in 1916 and to $2,500 in 1918. Immigrants, workers, farmers and people living in parts of the rural West and Midwest were most likely to patronize the Postal Savings System until the Great Depression, when high rates of use were no longer “limited to certain places and particular groups.” At its peak in 1947, the system held almost $3.4 billion in deposits. In addition to holding cash deposits, the system also sold fixed-term bonds and operated a Savings Card program. These cards provided spaces for a fixed number of postage stamps, each purchased for a few cents. Once filled, the cards could be presented for credit to a savings account in the system.

From 1921, depositors were fingerprinted. This was initially 'not to be associated with criminology' but in some instances the Yours Truly, Johnny Dollar radio show in the early 1950s suggested Postal Savings account fingerprints were used for positive identification in criminal cases.

According to a 2019 analysis, "the program was initially used by non-farming immigrant populations for short-term saving, then as a safe haven during the Great Depression, and finally as long-term investment for the wealthy during the 1940s... Postal Savings was only a partial substitute for traditional banks, as locations with banks often still heavily used postal savings."

Decline
The system originally had a natural advantage over deposit-taking private banks because the deposits were always backed by "the full faith and credit of the United States Government." However, because the establishment of the Federal Deposit Insurance Corporation gave a guarantee to depositors in private banks, the system lost its advantage in trust. The rise of United States Savings Bonds during and after World War II also drew funds away from the system. By the 1960s, with American banks fully recovered and more accepting of consumer deposits, the Postal Savings System was seen as redundant. A campaign by bankers dating back to the service's introduction had lobbied to create this impression, even though there were 1 million depositors. The government passed legislation requiring it to stop accepting deposits on July 1, 1967, and to transfer remaining deposits (approximately $50 million) to a claims fund of the United States Treasury. In 1971, most of the fund was distributed to state and local authorities in proportion to the obligations of individual post offices. Outstanding deposit claims were voided in 1985.

Locations 
On March 26, 1911, the locations of the central depositories for the first 19 states were established, followed the next day by 25 others. The post offices were selected by merit rather than by geography, based on those with the best efficiency record in the state. 

Bessemer, Alabama
Globe, Arizona
Stuttgart, Arkansas
Oroville, California
Leadville, Colorado
Ansonia, Connecticut
Dover, Delaware
Brunswick, Georgia
Coeur d'Alene, Idaho
Pekin, Illinois
Princeton, Indiana
Decorah, Iowa
Pittsburg, Kansas
Middlesboro, Kentucky
New Iberia, Louisiana
Rumford, Maine
Frostburg, Maryland
Norwood, Massachusetts
Houghton, Michigan
Anaconda, Montana
Nebraska City, Nebraska
Carson City, Nevada
Berlin, New Hampshire
Rutherford, New Jersey
Raton, New Mexico
Cohoes, New York
Salisbury, North Carolina
Wahpeton, North Dakota
Ashtabula, Ohio
Guymon, Oklahoma
Klamath Falls, Oregon
Dubois, Pennsylvania
Bristol, Rhode Island
Newberry, South Carolina
Deadwood, South Dakota
Johnson City, Tennessee
Port Arthur, Texas
Provo, Utah
Montpelier, Vermont
Clifton Forge, Virginia
Olympia, Washington
Grafton, West Virginia
Manitowoc, Wisconsin
Laramie, Wyoming

References 

United States Postal Service
1911 establishments in the United States
1967 disestablishments in the United States
Postal savings system